For the 1992–93 season, Carlisle United F.C. competed in Football League Third Division.

Results & fixtures

Football League Third Division

League table

Football League Cup

FA Cup

Football League Trophy

References

 11v11

Carlisle United F.C. seasons